Maish Nunatak is a nunatak located  west-southwest of Mount Moses, in the central part of the Hudson Mountains of Antarctica. It was mapped by the United States Geological Survey from surveys and U.S. Navy air photos, 1960–66, and was named by the Advisory Committee on Antarctic Names for F. Michael Maish, an ionospheric physicist at Byrd Station in 1967, who also served as a U.S. exchange scientist at Vostok Station in 1969.

References

Hudson Mountains
Nunataks of Ellsworth Land
Volcanoes of Ellsworth Land